Lewiston High School (LHS) is a public high school in Lewiston, Maine, United States. The school was founded in 1850 and has occupied its current building since 1973.The school mascot is the Blue Devil and the colors are blue and white. The new principal is Jonathan Radtke. From the 1930s to 1973 the high school was located on Central Ave and that building currently serves as Lewiston Middle School.

Sports 
Lewiston competes in Maine's Class A division for sports, the highest class in the state (except for basketball, which competes in AA), as governed by the Maine Principals' Association. Lewiston is also a member of the Kennebec Valley Athletic Conference. The school is particularly known for its cheerleading and boys soccer teams.

Boys soccer
Lewiston's Blue Devils boys soccer team won the state championships in 2015 and 2017 under coach Mike McGraw. The story of Somali immigrants to Maine and how their passion for soccer led Lewiston to their first state championship title in 2015 is told in the 2018 book One Goal by Amy Bass.

Notable alumni
 Tom Caron, sports broadcaster
 Thomas E. Delahanty, Maine Superior Court judge
 Susan W. Longley, State Senator and Judge of Probate (class of 1974)
 James L. Nelson, writer (class of 1980)
 Isaiah Harris (athlete),(class of 2015)

Lewiston Regional Technical Center 
Lewiston High School is also the home to the Lewiston Regional Technical Center. LRTC is the second largest vocational technical center in Maine. It offers programs in automotive technology, computer technology, health careers, criminal justice, culinary arts, nursing, and many other fields. The school serves over 800 students from six area high schools: Lewiston High School, Edward Little High School, Lisbon High School, Oak Hill High School, Leavitt Area High School, and Poland Regional High School.

Notes

External links 
 Lewiston High School

Public high schools in Maine
Schools in Lewiston–Auburn, Maine
Educational institutions established in 1850
1850 establishments in Maine
 
Educational buildings in Lewiston, Maine